Zhang Guangjian (1864/1867 – 1938) was a Chinese politician of the late Qing Dynasty and early Republican period. A native of Hefei, Anhui, he was the last Qing governor of Shandong, serving after the outbreak of the Xinhai Revolution in the province until the establishment of the Republic of China. Under the Beiyang government, he served as military governor of Shandong and later in the province of Gansu. Zhang was supported by the Jahriyya Sufi Hui Muslim leader Ma Yuanzhang, while being opposed by Hui Muslim General Ma Fuxiang, with Ma Fuxiang basing his opposition to Zhang's governorship in Gansu on the fact that he was not a native of the province. Zhang enacted a monopoly over the wool trade in Gansu and started collecting taxes on it.

Bibliography

林世田・劉波「國家珍貴古籍特展：跨越千年的對話」《光明日報》中華讀書報, 2009.6.24.

References

1860s births
1938 deaths
Military governors of Shandong
Military governors of Gansu
Republic of China civil governors of Gansu
Qing Dynasty military commanders of Shandong
Qing dynasty governors of Shandong
Qing dynasty lieutenant governors of Shandong
Politicians from Hefei
Qing dynasty politicians from Anhui
Empire of China (1915–1916)